Ranulph  was the first recorded archdeacon of Leicester:
he was appointed by Remigius, Bishop of Lincoln in 1092.

Notes

See also
 Diocese of Lincoln
 Diocese of Peterborough
 Diocese of Leicester
 Archdeacon of Leicester

Archdeacons of Leicester
11th-century English people